Caroline Julia Dinenage, Baroness Lancaster of Kimbolton,  (born 28 October 1971), also styled as Dame Caroline Dinenage, is a British Conservative Party politician who has been the  Member of Parliament (MP) for Gosport since 2010. She was re-elected in 2015, 2017, and 2019.

Dinenage served as a minister from May 2015 until September 2021 in six different government departments, under three successive prime ministers as  Parliamentary Under-Secretary of State at the Government Equalities Office, Ministry of Justice, Department for Education and Department for Work and Pensions. In January 2018 Minister of State at the Department of Health and Social Care, and in February 2020 at the Department for Digital, Culture, Media and Sport.

Dinenage was appointed Dame Commander of the Order of the British Empire (DBE) in the 2022 Political Honours.

Early life and career
Dinenage was born on 28 October 1971, the daughter of television presenter Fred Dinenage and Beverley Summers.

She attended Wykeham House private school for girls, Oaklands RC Comprehensive School, Waterlooville, and then studied Politics and English at Swansea University.

Dinenage established her first manufacturing company aged 19 and was a director/company secretary of Dinenages Ltd for 20 years.

In May 1998 she was elected as the youngest member in Winchester District Council. She stood as the Conservative Party candidate for Portsmouth South in the 2005 general election.

Parliamentary career

Dinenage was elected as Member of Parliament for Gosport in 2010, after the retirement of Sir Peter Viggers.

Backbench career 
Dinenage sat on the Business, Innovation and Skills Select Committee 2012–2015. In 2013, she was appointed as a Small Business Ambassador by Prime Minister, David Cameron.

Dinenage successfully campaigned for a medal for the veterans of the Arctic convoys of World War II. She served as the vice-chair (Royal Navy) of the All Party Parliamentary Group for Armed Forces 2010–2014, and was a UK delegate to the NATO Parliamentary Assembly and vice-chair of the NATO Science and Technology Sub-Committee.

Dinenage was again made a backbencher following the September 2021 reshuffle. Since then she has launched the All Party Parliamentary Group on Carers and is also on the Women and Equalities Committee.

Justice Minister 
Campaign group Action 4 Ashes praised Dinenage for her swift action as Justice Minister in introducing important changes to cremation regulation.

Minister for Women and Equalities 
In her role as Minister for Women and Equalities, Dinenage implemented the Gender Pay Gap reporting regulations which came into force in April 2017.

Education Minister 
As Education Minister she delivered the government's manifesto commitment of 30 hours' free childcare for 3 and 4 year olds.

Minister for Care 
In January 2018, Dinenage was appointed as Minister of State for Care at the Department for Health & Social Care. Dinenage was the first minister since Alistair Burt to hold the social care portfolio at Minister of State level, after Theresa May handed the portfolio to a Parliamentary Under-Secretary of State under David Mowat and Jackie Doyle-Price. Dinenage's appointment was welcomed by learning disabilities charity Hft, who had campaigned for the restoration of the Minister of State role during the snap election of 2017.

In this role Dinenage launched a consultation on Changing Places toilets: the resulting building regulation changes would ensure larger accessible toilets were added to more than 150 major buildings a year.

In June 2018 Dinenage launched the Carers Action Plan to support unpaid carers in England.

In November 2019 she introduced plans for making learning disability and autism training mandatory for all Health and Social Care professionals.

Minister for Digital and Culture 
Following the outbreak of COVID-19 in the UK, Dinenage helped secure the £2 billion Culture Recovery Fund.

She also had ministerial responsibility for the Online Safety Bill, which was published in draft form in 2021. Dinenage held this role until September 2021 and is now once again a backbencher.

Constituency work
Dinenage worked with local partners to secure Enterprise Zone status for the Daedalus disused military airfield at Lee-on-the-Solent  in 2010.

Dinenage has campaigned for local road improvements, helping secure £25.7m Government funding for the Stubbington Bypass, which has now been completed.

Personal life
Dinenage has two children with her first husband Carlos Garreta, a Royal Navy officer. In February 2014, she married Mark Lancaster, Baron Lancaster of Kimbolton, a former MP and now member of the House of Lords, giving Dinenage the title Lady Lancaster.

She has made a parachute jump and abseiled off Portsmouth's Spinnaker Tower to raise funds for the MS Society. A patron of Conservatives against Fox Hunting, she was named one of Queen guitarist and animal welfare campaigner Brian May's Heroes of 2010.

References

External links

Caroline Dinenage website
Caroline Dinenage profile at TheyWorkForYou.com

|-

|-

1971 births
Living people
Alumni of Swansea University
Conservative Party (UK) MPs for English constituencies
UK MPs 2010–2015
UK MPs 2015–2017
UK MPs 2017–2019
UK MPs 2019–present
Female members of the Parliament of the United Kingdom for English constituencies
Councillors in Hampshire
Politicians from Portsmouth
People educated at Oaklands Catholic School
21st-century British women politicians
Lancaster of Kimbolton
Spouses of life peers
21st-century English women
21st-century English people
Women councillors in England
Dames Commander of the Order of the British Empire